Jean d'Aspremont is a legal theorist and an international lawyer. He is a Professor of Law at Sciences Po in Paris as well as with the University of Manchester. He is from the family of d'Aspremont Lynden. Born in Belgium, he has both Belgian and French citizenships. Originally trained as an international lawyer, he has established himself as a critical legal theorist.

Early life and education
He was born on 17 January 1978 and raised in Brussels, Belgium. He received his Ph.D in law from UCLouvain in 2005. He received a LL.M from Cambridge University in 2001. He also studied at Saint-Louis University, Brussels (1995-1997) and the Université catholique de Louvain (1997-2000).

Academic career

After completing his PhD in French in 2005, he moved to the United States where he was affiliated with New York University (NYU). He returned to Europe in 2007 and was appointed lecturer in international law at the University of Leiden. He later moved to the University of Amsterdam where he became associate professor at the University of Amsterdam (2009 -2013) and later professor of international legal theory (2013-2017). He also was the Editor-in-Chief of the Leiden Journal of International Law in 2011. In 2012, he was appointed as a Professor of Public International Law at University of Manchester where he founded Manchester International Law Center (MILC) with Iain Scobbie. In 2013, he was simultaneously appointed as a professor of international legal theory at University of Amsterdam. In 2017, he was appointed as a Professor of Law at Sciences Po School of Law.

He has produced extensively on wide breadth of topics of public international law and legal theory. He is especially known for his publications on the theory of international law, the theory of sources, state responsibility, and international organizations. He has published a dozen of monographs and edited volumes as well as more than a hundred of peer-reviewed articles and book chapters. Some of his articles and books have been translated in Spanish, Portuguese, Russian, Hindi, Japanese and Persian.

He is a board member of several law journals and general editor of the Cambridge Studies in International and Comparative Law at Cambridge University Press. He also his general editor of the Melland Schill Studies in International Law at Manchester University Press. In 2017, he launched Oxford International Organization with Oxford University Press of which he is now the Editor-in-Chief with Catherïne Brölmann. He is one of the main authors of the 2020 Principles on Shared Responsibility in International Law.

Engagement

He represented Burundi in proceedings in front of the International Court of Justice (Kosovo Advisory Opinion, 2009-2010). He taught for several years at the University of Burundi. He has been an expert for several Latin American States in proceedings before international courts, including the Inter-American Court of Human Rights. He is a member of the board of the African Society of International Law. He was consulted by the Constitutional Assembly of Tunisia on questions of international law and auditioned in July 2012 during the preparation of the new constitution of Tunisia.

Selected publications

Books
International Law as a Belief System, 2017, Cambridge University Press
Formalism in the Sources of International Law. A Theory of the Ascertainment of Legal Rules, 2011, Oxford University Press
Concepts for International Law: Contribution to Disciplinary Thought (Edward Elgar, 2019) (co-edited with Sahib Singh)
Oxford Handbook on the Sources of International Law (edited with Samantha Besson), 2017, Oxford University Press
Epistemic Forces in International Law: Essays on the Foundational Doctrines and Techniques of International Legal Argumentation, 2015, Edward Elgar Publishing
Participants in the International Legal System: Multiple Perspectives on Non-State Actors in International Law (edited), 2011, Routledge
International Legal Positivism in a Post-Modern World (edited with Jörg Kammerhofer), 2014, Cambridge University Press
Droit international humanitaire (with J.D Hemptinne), 2012, Pedone
L’Etat non démocratique en droit international, 2008, Pedone

References

External links 
 

Living people
International law scholars
Academics of the University of Manchester
Year of birth missing (living people)
Université catholique de Louvain alumni
Alumni of the University of Cambridge
Counts of Belgium
Counts of the Holy Roman Empire